Paolo Tringali (31 August 1925 – 26 September 2022) was an Italian politician. A member of the Italian Social Movement – National Right, he served in the Chamber of Deputies from 1983 to 1987 and from 1994 to 2001.

Tringali died in Acireale on 26 September 2022, at the age of 97.

References

1925 births
2022 deaths
Italian Social Movement politicians
National Alliance (Italy) politicians
Deputies of Legislature VIII of Italy
Deputies of Legislature IX of Italy
Deputies of Legislature XII of Italy
Deputies of Legislature XIII of Italy
Italian trade unionists
Politicians from Catania